Iona is a 2015 drama film directed by Scott Graham and starring Ruth Negga. It is set on the Scottish island of Iona.

The film earned Ruth Negga a nomination for Best Actress at the 2016 British Academy Scotland Awards.

Summary
Iona and her son go to a holy island to hide from a violent crime. As her son seeks forgiveness for his crime, Iona comes to terms with her lack of faith.

Reception
On review aggregator Rotten Tomatoes, the film holds an approval rating of 63%, based on 16 reviews with an average rating of 5.64/10.

References

External links
 

2015 films
Scottish films
English-language Scottish films
Iona
2010s English-language films